Carlo Emilio Bonferroni (28 January 1892 – 18 August 1960) was an Italian mathematician who worked on probability theory.

Biography
Bonferroni studied piano and conducting in Turin Conservatory and at University of Turin under Giuseppe Peano and Corrado Segre, where he obtained his laurea. During this time he also studied at University of Vienna and ETH Zurich. During World War I, he was an officer among the engineers. Bonferroni held a position as assistant professor at the Polytechnic University of Turin, and in 1923 took up the chair of financial mathematics at the Economics Institute of the University of Bari. In 1933 he transferred to University of Florence, where he held his chair until his death.

Bonferroni is best known for the Bonferroni inequalities (a generalization of the union bound), and for the Bonferroni correction in statistics (which he did not invent, but which is related to the Bonferroni inequalities).

See also 

 Bonferroni inequalities
 Bonferroni correction

References

Further reading
Material about Bonferroni by Michael Dewey

1892 births
1960 deaths
19th-century Italian mathematicians
20th-century Italian mathematicians
Probability theorists
Italian statisticians
University of Turin alumni
Academic staff of the Polytechnic University of Turin
Academic staff of the University of Bari
Academic staff of the University of Florence
People from Bergamo
Econometricians